Dollman or Dollmann may refer to:

 Doll Man, a fictional superhero
 Dollman (film), a 1991 science fiction film
 Friedrich Dollmann (1882–1944), German general during World War II
 Guy Dollman (1886–1942), a British zoologist and taxonomist
 John Charles Dollman (1851–1934), a British artist 
 Phil Dollman (born 1985), Welsh rugby union player

See also
 Dolman (disambiguation)